Douglas William Turner (born January 3, 1969) is the founding partner of the global communications firm Agenda. He also was a Republican candidate for the New Mexico gubernatorial election in 2010, where he was defeated in the primary election by Susana Martinez.

Early life and education
Born and raised in Albuquerque, New Mexico, Turner attended American University School of International Service in Washington, D.C. where he received a bachelor’s in International Relations.  Upon completion, Turner attended Universite Libre de Bruxelles where he earned a master's degree in International Relations.

Career
In 1996, Turner founded the communications firm, DW Turner Inc. In 2012, Turner partnered with two other directors, the merging of these companies creating the international communications firm Agenda, LLC. Agenda has worked with a number of U.S. and international companies including USAID, The Navajo Transitional Energy Company, UN Women, and NATO HQ. Turner expanded Agenda to include offices in Albuquerque, NM, Washington DC, Balkans, Republic of Georgia, and Brussels.

As of 2019, Agenda has won several Reed Awards as presented by Campaigns and Elections.

In 2015 Turner Founded Heritage Driven, A Land Rover Defender shop.

Outside of his businesses Turner was the State Director (1994) and Campaign Manager (1998) for Gary Johnson's (R-NM) gubernatorial campaigns and worked as a General Consultant for both administrations. He also served as a Deputy Political Director for Steve Forbes' 2000 bid for president of the United States. Over the years Turner managed campaigns for the U.S. Senate, the U.S. House of Representatives, the New Mexico state legislature and consulted on political campaigns in Asia and Europe.

Turner also serves as chair and on several boards throughout local and national associations such as the NRA, Community Empowerment Fund, and Public Charter Schools of New Mexico.

Writings
A former syndicated columnist, Turner's articles have appeared in Time magazine, the Financial Times, the Far Eastern Economic Review, the Carnegie Council's Policy Innovations, and Japan's Yomiuri Shimbun.

Personal life
As a native New Mexican, Turner resides in Albuquerque, where he and his wife Mala Htun raise their three children.

References 

1969 births
Living people
American University School of International Service alumni
New Mexico Republicans
People educated at a United World College